Félix González (born 25 October 1945) is a Spanish racing cyclist. He rode in the 1973 Tour de France.

References

External links
 

1945 births
Living people
Spanish male cyclists
Place of birth missing (living people)
People from Arrigorriaga
Sportspeople from Biscay
Cyclists from the Basque Country (autonomous community)